Drew Harvey (born 26 August 1978 in Norwich) is a British sport shooter. He competed at the 2000 Summer Olympics in the men's skeet event, in which he tied for 39th place.

References

1978 births
Living people
Skeet shooters
British male sport shooters
Shooters at the 2000 Summer Olympics
Olympic shooters of Great Britain
Commonwealth Games medallists in shooting
Commonwealth Games silver medallists for England
Commonwealth Games bronze medallists for England
Shooters at the 1998 Commonwealth Games
Shooters at the 2002 Commonwealth Games
20th-century British people
21st-century British people
Medallists at the 1998 Commonwealth Games
Medallists at the 2002 Commonwealth Games